Westhaven (Te Tai Tapu) Marine Reserve is a marine reserve covering an area of  in the Whanganui Inlet at the top of New Zealand's South Island. It was established in 1994 and is administered by the Department of Conservation.

The inlet and reserve are located in the Tasman District west of the road between Golden Bay and Farewell Spit, and north-west of Nelson.

Geography

It divides into northeast and southwest tidal channels, spilling out onto expansive sandflats. The estuary is surrounded by lush native forest.

Within the boundary of the marine reserve, seagrass beds, salt marshes, tidal wetlands, dunes, cliffs, islands, rock platforms and underwater reefs provide habits for a range of species.

History

Ngāti Rarua, Ngāti Tama and Te Atiawa used the inlet as a place to live and gather food. There is still evidence of sacred sites and previous occupations.

European settlers felled and logged the coastal forest, milled flax, and mined the land for coal and gold. The forest has regenerated since then, with limited permanent ecological damage.

The marine reserve was officially established in 9 May 2014.

A local man purchased a section of the forest in 1987 to protect and restore it. The forest was sold to the New Zealand Government in 2005 and added to the Kahurangi National Park in 2016. Minister of Conservation Nick Smith celebrated the addition by kayaking through the marine reserve.

Flora and fauna

About 30 marine fish use the inlet for some of their life cycle. Snapper, flatfish and kahawai use it as a breeding and nursery area. Other fish enter the estuary to find food in the seagrass beds and sandflats.

Many waders and sea birds fly around the inlet and farmland. Numerous other birds live in the coastal forest, including pigeon, welcome swallow, bellbird and tui. Some birds find their food in the inlet but live in the forest or wetland, including kingfisher and banded rail.

Recreation

All plant and animal life within the marine reserve are protected, and fishing and shooting are not permitted. Vehicle launching of boats is permitted at Mangarākau Wharf and near the Kaihoka Road turnoff, but vehicles and trail bikes are not allowed at any other parts of the boat.

People must not feed fish as it disturbs their natural behaviour, and they must take care when anchoring to avoid damaging the sea floor.

See also
 Marine reserves of New Zealand

References

Marine reserves of New Zealand
Protected areas of the Tasman District
Tasman District
1994 establishments in New Zealand
Protected areas established in 1994